RTL Group (for "Radio Television Luxembourg") is a Luxembourg-based international media conglomerate, with another corporate centre in Cologne, Germany. The company operates 68 television channels and 31 radio stations in Germany, France and other European countries. It also offers national streaming platforms, content productions and a range of digital services. Important segments of RTL Group are RTL Deutschland, Groupe M6, Fremantle and RTL Nederland.

The company, in its present form, was established by Bertelsmann, Groupe Bruxelles Lambert (GBL) and Pearson in the year 2000. Over the years, Bertelsmann, a conglomerate based in the German city of Gütersloh, continued to increase its stake in RTL Group and currently owns just over 75% of the shares in the company after holding a stake of more than 90% in the past. RTL Group is one of a total of eight divisions of Bertelsmann: It is responsible for more than a third of its revenue and a large share of its operating profit.

It is one of the founding members of the European Broadcasting Union.

History

Historical background 
The roots of RTL Group date back to the 1920s. The company itself was established in 1931 as the Compagnie Luxembourgeoise de Radiodiffusion (known as CLR for short). It was one of the world's first private broadcasting companies. After the Second World War, the company ventured into the world of television broadcasting. It was renamed Compagnie Luxembourgeoise de Télédiffusion (CLT) to reflect this new service in 1954. Under the name RTL (for Radio Télévision Luxembourg), it went on to provide its private broadcasting services in several European countries. When the European media markets were liberalised in the 1980s, television became increasingly important and started to overtake radio.

In the 1980s, Belgian and French media companies made up the majority of the shareholders of CLR and CLT. The following decades witnessed repeated conflicts for domination within the company and among its subsidiaries. In the 1990s, Bertelsmann ultimately came out on top after having gradually increased its stake in the German television channel RTL. Following a legal dispute with RTL/CLT, Bertelsmann announced plans to merge the television businesses of UFA to form the joint venture CLT-UFA in April 1996. A merger agreement was signed on 8 July 1996. It was approved by the CLT board of directors on 5 December, and the formation of CLT-UFA was completed on 14 January 1997. As a result, German television channels such as RTL Television and VOX and international broadcasting services, including M6 in France, were all brought together under one roof.

Growth and stock market launch 
CLT-UFA not only grew organically but also increased in size due to a number of acquisitions. In the year 2000, Bertelsmann and Pearson announced plans to merge their television, radio and production activities. The two companies joined forces to create RTL Group, Europe's leading network of television channels and radio stations with a global content business, which was rebranded FremantleMedia in 2001 (now called Fremantle). This merger was designed to provide a strong European response to U.S. media dominance.

RTL Group was first listed on the London Stock Exchange on 26 July 2000. The existing shell of Audiofina, which was already a listed company, was used to simplify the administrative effort involved in the stock market launch. The issue price of the RTL Group share was calculated based on the closing prices of Audiofina in Luxembourg and Brussels. The RTL Group share consequently replaced the Audiofina listing.

Acquisition by Bertelsmann 
Although Bertelsmann initially only held a minority share in RTL Group, the German conglomerate managed by Thomas Middelhoff set its sights on playing a leading role within the group. After exchanging shares with the Groupe Bruxelles Lambert (GBL) in 2001, Bertelsmann achieved its goal of becoming the majority shareholder of RTL Group and thus secured a leading position in the European television market.

Over the years, Bertelsmann increased its stake in RTL Group to more than 90%. Bertelsmann's initial aim was to acquire full ownership of RTL Group to reduce administrative costs, but this plan failed in 2007 due to uncertainties in Luxembourg law. The conglomerate responded by altering its strategy and in 2013, it sold a minority interest in RTL Group on the Frankfurt Stock Exchange to finance the growth of Bertelsmann and especially its digital transformation. Media reports responded positively to the secondary listing of RTL Group and the resulting availability of shares open to external investors.

Recent developments 
RTL Group was already responsible for a large part of the revenue and profit of Bertelsmann in 2001. In the new structure of Bertelsmann, which was introduced in 2016, the company maintained its position as an important division. Since April 2019, Thomas Rabe, chairman and chief executive officer of Bertelsmann, has also simultaneously been at the helm of RTL Group. Under his management, the company is pursuing the objective of strengthening its core businesses, establishing local streaming services and further developing advertising technologies. Fostering its alliances and partnerships with other companies in the European media industry also plays an important role in the current strategy of RTL Group.

Corporate affairs 
RTL Group S.A. is the parent company of the entire corporate group. Its legal form is a société anonyme, a public limited company under Luxembourg law. It was entered into the Luxembourg Trade Register on 29 March 1973. The company's main corporate objective is to develop audio-visual media and to lead and manage other companies active in the same field.

Listing 
RTL Group S.A. currently has a net worth of €191,845,074. It is divided into 154,742,806 shares without nominal value, which are traded on the Luxembourg and Frankfurt Stock Exchanges. RTL Group S.A. shares are included in the German SDAX, a stock index for medium-sized companies. They are also included in the SXMP, a sector index for the European media industry.

Bertelsmann holds more than 75% of the shares in RTL Group S.A. The second-largest shareholder is Silchester International Investors, a British investment company based in London, which has a stake of around 5%. This shareholding forms part of the group's free float, which has at a stable value of between 20 and 25%.

Management 
The highest authority of RTL Group S.A. is its board of directors, in which the power to manage and control the group's business is vested. The Board of Directors has 13 members; there are currently eleven men and two women serving on the Board. Martin Taylor is the Chairman of the Board of Directors; the other members are Thomas Götz, Elmar Heggen, Immanuel Hermreck, Bernd Hirsch, Bernd Kundrun, Guillaume de Posch, Thomas Rabe, Jean-Louis Schiltz, Rolf Schmidt-Holtz, James Singh, Bettina Wulf and Lauren Zalaznick.

The operational business of RTL Group is headed by Thomas Rabe (Chief Executive Officer, CEO), Elmar Heggen (Chief Operating Officer, COO and Deputy CEO) and Björn Bauer (Chief Financial Officer, CFO). Together they form the executive committee of RTL Group S.A., which is supported by the group management committee and operations management committee. The management boards of RTL Group are based in Luxembourg and Cologne, Germany.

Corporate centre 
The headquarters of RTL Group, according to trade law, is located in the so-called "RTL City", which is located at Boulevard Pierre Frieden in the Kirchberg quarter in the north-east of Luxembourg City. Bertelsmann initially planned to sell the complex and lease it back in 2017 but ultimately decided to delay the transaction for an indefinite period. Besides the Luxembourg headquarters, there is another corporate centre located in the Cologne borough of Deutz, North Rhine-Westphalia.

Key figures 
In the 2019 financial year, RTL Group generated revenue of around €6.7 billion with a profit of €1.1 billion. The revenue mainly came from advertising (44% television, 4% radio), content production (22%), digital activities (16%) and platform businesses (6%). RTL Group generated 32% of its revenue in Germany, 22% in France, 16% in the United States, 8% in the Netherlands, 4% in Great Britain and 3% in Belgium.

Divisions 
RTL Group operates television channels, radio stations, streaming platforms, content production, a range of digital services and advertising sales. All of its business activities are assigned to 14 areas. The main segments of RTL Group are Mediengruppe RTL Deutschland, Groupe M6, Fremantle and RTL Nederland. We Are Era, RTL Hungary, RTL Luxembourg, SpotX and other businesses all fall into the "others" segment, as does the Group's minority interest in Atresmedia, a leading Spanish media company.

RTL Deutschland 

RTL Deutschland is based in Cologne and operates the free-to-air channels RTL Television, VOX (entertainment), RTLup, RTL Nitro, VOXup, and ntv (news), along with holding a significant stake in RTLZWEI. Most of these channels have Austrian and Swiss versions for the insertion of nation-specific advertising. It also offers pay-TV channels such as RTL Crime, RTL Living, RTL Passion and GEO Television. The company additionally operates a streaming service under the name RTL+ (formerly TV Now).

Advertising space for RTL Deutschland is sold by the advertising company Ad Alliance, which also works with other Bertelsmann companies and further partners. RTL Deutschland is also part of Bertelsmann's Content Alliance.

Groupe M6 

The headquarters of the Groupe M6 media holding company are located in Neuilly-sur-Seine in Paris. The company operates the television channels 6ter, M6 and W9, the channels Paris Première and Téva, as well as children's channel Gulli. These channels are joined by radio stations such as RTL Radio France and Fun Radio and the streaming service 6play. Salto, a joint streaming service by France Télévisions, Groupe M6 and TF1, is currently in its test phase. Groupe M6 subsidiaries M6 Film, M6 Studio, SND and Studio 89 Productions are among the best-known production and film rights companies in the French-speaking world. Although RTL Group only owns a minority interest in Groupe M6, it controls the listed company and consolidates it in its balance sheet. On 18 May 2021, Groupe M6 and Groupe TF1 announced that they had begun negotiations to merge. On 16 September 2022, the merger was officially abandoned. On September 22, 2022, Thomas Rabe, CEO of RTL Group's parent company, Bertelsmann confirmed that Groupe M6 is up for sale, after the failed merger with TF1 Group. On October 3, 2022, RTL Group confirmed that they wouldn't be selling their stake in Groupe M6.

Fremantle 

The head office of Fremantle (formerly FremantleMedia) is located in London. The company, which operates in 31 countries, creates, produces and distributes content for broadcasters of RTL Group (including TV channels and streaming platforms) and other clients, for example Amazon Prime Video and Netflix. It not only produces films and series (for example Deutschland 86) but also shows. Fremantle has attracted global attention with its casting shows such as Got Talent and Idols, which have been adapted in a multitude of countries worldwide, and owns popular game shows like The Price Is Right and Family Feud.

RTL Nederland 

RTL Nederland (formerly the Holland Media Group) is a Dutch company based in Hilversum. Its television channels RTL 4, RTL 5, RTL 7, RTL 8, RTL Z, RTL Crime, RTL Lounge and RTL Telekids all have licences issued by Luxembourg. RTL Nederland also operates the streaming service Videoland and the free streaming service RTL XL. In June 2021 Talpa Network and RTL Nederland announced an intent to merge; RTL is to hold 70% and Talpa is to hold 30% in the new company, pending approval by the Dutch ACM and the European Commission. In January 2022 the Netherlands Authority for Consumers and Markets stated that it could not approve the merger as of yet and that further investigation to the consequences of price, quality and innovation is necessary. On the 30th of January 2023 the Authority announced that it would not approve the merger, citing that the merged company would become too powerful.

Former divisions 
RTL Group or its prececessors previously operated or owned stakes in other TV channels or channel families, including RTL Belgium, RTL9, Channel 5, REN TV, RTL Croatia, Alpha TV, RTL 7, and TVI.

RTL Belgium 
The headquarters of RTL Belgium are located in Brussels in the so-called "RTL House". The television channel RTL-TVI and related channels such as Club RTL and Plug RTL form the core of the company's business activities. These channels also have licences issued by Luxembourg, causing numerous problems to them. Being Luxembourgish channels, they do not face the same requirements and laws as for the Belgian  TV channels, creating potential problems for disloyal competition. RTL Belgium additionally operates radio stations such as Bel RTL. Almost all of its services are provided in French. In June 2021 it was announced that RTL Belgium would be sold for €250 million to DPG Media and Rossel, pending regulatory approval. The sale was effectuated on March 31, 2022.

Controversies 
Observers have repeatedly criticised RTL Group for having "missed the boat in the streaming era". Thomas Rabe, chairman and chief executive officer of Bertelsmann, has responded to this criticism by campaigning for the deregulation of the highly competitive television market to enable the establishment of national alternatives to the "giants of Silicon Valley".

See also 

 European News Exchange

Notes and references

External links 

 Official website of the RTL Group

1929 establishments in Luxembourg
Bertelsmann subsidiaries
Brands of Luxembourg
Companies based in Luxembourg City
Companies in the BEL Mid Index
Dutch-language television networks
European Broadcasting Union members
French-language television networks
German-language television networks
Holding companies of Luxembourg
International radio networks
Mass media companies established in 1929
Mass media companies of Luxembourg
Multilingual broadcasters
Multinational companies headquartered in Luxembourg
Pan-European media companies
RTL Group
Television networks in France
Television networks in Germany
Companies in the MDAX